Sông Đà is a ward (phường) of Mường Lay in Điện Biên Province, northwestern Vietnam.

Communes of Điện Biên province
Populated places in Điện Biên province